Michala Elsberg Møller (born 16 February 2000) is a Danish handball player for Herning-Ikast Håndbold and the Danish national junior team.

She also represented Denmark in the 2017 European Women's U-17 Handball Championship, 2018 Women's Youth World Handball Championship, and in the 2019 Women's Junior European Handball Championship, placing 6th all three times.

She represented Denmark at the 2021 World Women's Handball Championship in Spain.

Achievements 
Danish Women's Handball League:
Silver Medalist: 2019
Danish Cup:
Winner: 2019

References

2000 births
Living people
Sportspeople from Aalborg
Danish female handball players